Sean Greenwood (born 30 July 1987) is a Canadian-born skeleton racer that represents Ireland. He competed for Ireland at the 2014 Winter Olympics in the Skeleton event.  Previous to the 2012–13 season he represented Canada in North America Cup races.

See also
Ireland at the 2014 Winter Olympics

References

External links
Sochi2014 Profile

1987 births
Living people
Skeleton racers at the 2014 Winter Olympics
Canadian people of Irish descent
Irish male skeleton racers
Olympic skeleton racers of Ireland